The national flag of Egypt is a tricolour consisting of the three equal horizontal red, white, and black bands of the Egyptian revolutionary flag that dates back to the 1952 Egyptian Revolution. The flag bears Egypt's national emblem, the Egyptian eagle of Saladin, centred in the white band.

Symbolism
In 1952, the Egyptian Free Officers who toppled King Farouk in the 23 July Revolution assigned specific symbolism to each of the three bands of the revolutionary and liberation flag. The red band symbolizes the  Egyptians’ bloods in the war against colonization. The white band symbolizes the purity of the Egyptians’ hearts. The black band below the white symbolizes the manner in which darkness is overcome.

Egypt's Revolutionary and Liberation flag, which was designed on 23 July 1952, was then an inspiration to several Arab countries and was adopted by many Arab states. The same horizontal tricolour is used by Iraq, Syria, Sudan and Yemen (and formerly Libya), the only difference being the presence (or absence) of distinguishing national emblems in the white band.

Colours scheme

History
The development of the modern Egyptian flag was determined first by the Muhammad Ali Dynasty, under whom Egypt was united with Sudan, and later by the rise of Egyptian nationalism and revolutionary ideas among the Egyptian Army.

Muhammad Ali Dynasty (1805–1922)
When Muhammad Ali successfully seized power in Egypt, at that time the country was officially an Eyalet (Cum Eyalet) of the Ottoman Empire. However, throughout his reign, and that of his sons and grandsons, Egypt enjoyed virtual independence as an own Khedivate. The meaning of the three stars and crescents has been suggested that this was to symbolise the victory of his armies in three continents (Africa, Asia, and Europe), and his own sovereignty over Egypt, Sudan, and Hejaz. The similarity with the flag of the Ottoman Empire was deliberate, as Muhammad Ali harbored grandiose ambitions of deposing the Ottoman dynasty, and seizing the sultanic throne himself.

Egypt retained this flag even after formal Ottoman sovereignty was terminated in 1914, when Egypt was declared to be a sultanate, and a British protectorate.

After the Urabi Revolt in 1882, British forces occupied the country, igniting ever greater nationalist resentment. This reached a peak in the Revolution of 1919, when both the red flag introduced by Muhammad Ali, and a special green banner bearing a crescent and cross were used in protests against the British (the latter symbolizing that both Egypt's Muslim and Christian communities supported the Egyptian nationalist movement against the occupation).

Kingdom of Egypt (1922–1953)

In 1922, the UK agreed to formally recognize Egyptian independence, but only on the condition that the Sultan of Egypt, Fuad I, change his title to King. Upon so doing, the now King Fuad issued a Royal Decree formally adopting a new national flag of a white crescent with three white stars on a green background in it.

The three stars symbolised the three component territories of the Kingdom, namely Egypt, Nubia, and Sudan, whilst the green signifies the agricultural nature of the country, other sources suggest that it symbolised the predominant religion of the country, Islam. It has also been suggested that the three stars represented the three religious communities of the country: Muslims, Christians and Jews.

Republic of Egypt (1953–1958) – Egyptian Free Officers movement

Following the Revolution of 1952, the Egyptian free officers retained the flag of the Kingdom, but also introduced the Revolutionary and Liberation flag of red, white, and black horizontal bands, with the emblem of the Revolution, the Eagle of Saladin, in the center band. This earlier version of the eagle differs somewhat from the one later adopted. Even when the Kingdom was formally abolished by the declaration of the Republic on July 18, 1953, the flag of the Kingdom remained in official use, until Gamal Abdel Nasser announced the formation of a new regional political union and changed the name to United Arab Republic in 1958. The new flag symbolised a break from the Ottoman-inspired flags of the monarchical period, placing emphasis on the Arab nationalism then espoused by the Nasser government.

United Arab Republic – Egyptian-Syrian Union under President Gamal Abdel Nasser (1958–1972)

In 1958, Syria united with Egypt to form the United Arab Republic (UAR), The UAR adopted a national flag based on the original Egyptian Liberation flag after the revolution, but with two green stars (representing the two constituent countries of the union) replacing the former Egyptian Eagle in the white band. A modified version of that eagle was then adopted as the UAR's coat of arms. The flag with the 2 green stars, representing the two nations is now still used as the national flag of Syria. The flag of the United Arab Republic was briefly used by the Yemen Arab Republic for two months.

Federation of Arab Republics (1972–1984) – A regional union attempt by Muammar Gaddafi 

Though Syria withdrew from the UAR in 1961, Egypt continued to use the official name of the United Arab Republic until 1971, when the country was renamed officially as the Arab Republic of Egypt. In 1972, when Egypt formed the Federation of Arab Republics along with Syria, and Libya, the UAR's flag (whose design Syria would reuse for their own flag, eight years later) was replaced by a common flag for the Federation, once again based on the Arab Liberation flag. The two green stars in the white band were replaced by the Hawk of Qureish, which had been the coat of arms of Syria prior to the formation of the UAR in 1958. The Hawk of Qureish was also adopted as the Federation's coat of arms.

Arab Republic of Egypt (1984–present) – President Abdel Fattah El-Sisi

Whilst the Federation of Arab Republics was dissolved in 1977, Egypt retained the Federation's flag until October 4, 1984, when the black Hawk of Qureish was replaced in the white band (and on the coat of arms) by the Eagle of Saladin (the 1958 version as opposed to the 1952 version). The shield held by the eagle is colored entirely gold and white, as opposed to the colors seen on the shield on Egypt's coat of arms.

Rules governing the hoisting of the flag
The flag is hoisted on all Egyptian governmental buildings on Fridays, national holidays, the opening session of the House of Representatives, and any other occasions as determined by the Minister of the Interior. The flag is hoisted daily on border posts, customs buildings, Egyptian consulates, and embassies overseas on Revolution Day (July 23), and other national holidays, as well as during the visit of the Egyptian President to the country hosting the diplomatic mission.

Abusing the flag in any way is a criminal offense and is punishable under law as it implies the contempt of the power of the state. Penal provisions also govern abuse of foreign flags or national emblems of other countries.

See also

Coat of arms of Egypt
Flags of the Egyptian Armed Forces
List of Egyptian flags
Pan-Arab colors
Flag of Iraq (similar design, Takbir in green calligraphic script instead of Eagle)
Flag of Sudan (similar design, green triangle at the hoist)
Flag of Syria (similar design, two green stars instead of Eagle)
Flag of Yemen (similar design, without any element)

References

Sources

External links

 

 
Egypt
Egypt